These are the number-one singles of 1965 according to the Top 100 Singles chart in Cashbox magazine.

See also
 1965 in music
 List of Hot 100 number-one singles of 1965 (U.S.)

References
 
 

1965
1965 record charts
1965 in American music